Thun is a municipality in Switzerland.

Thun may also refer to:
 Thun District, Switzerland
 Thun (administrative district), in the Canton of Bern, Switzerland
 FC Thun, a Swiss football team from Thun
 Lake Thun, an Alpine lake in the Bernese Oberland in Switzerland
 Thun Castle, a Swiss heritage site in Thun

People with the surname
 Matteo Thun (born 1952), Italian architect and designer
 Michael Thun, American cancer researcher

See also

Thon (disambiguation)